This is a list of the High Sheriffs of Northamptonshire.

The High Sheriff is the oldest secular office under the Crown.  Formerly the High Sheriff was the principal law enforcement officer in the county but over the centuries most of the responsibilities associated with the post have been transferred elsewhere or are now defunct, so that its functions are now largely ceremonial.  The High Sheriff changes every March.

Sheriffs

Before the 13th century
c.1070–c1090 William of Keynes (or Cahaignes) 
c.1086 Hugh fitzBaldric
c1125–1128: Hugh de Warelville
1129: Richard Basset and Aubrey de Vere II
1154: Richard Basset and Aubrey de Vere II
1155–1156: Simon Fitz Peter
1161–1162: Hugh Gobion
1163: Simon Fitz Peter and Hugh Gobion
1164–1168: Simon Fitz Peter
1169–1173: Robert, son of Gawini
1174–1176: Hugo de Gundevill
1177–1182: Thomas, son of Bernard
1183: Thomas and Radulph Morin
1184–1186: Geoffrey Fitz Peter
1189: Geoffrey Fitz Peter
1190–1191: Richard Engaigne
1192–1193: Geoffrey Fitz Peter and Robert, son of Radulph
1194: Godfrey and Simon of Pattishall
1195–1203: Simon of Pattishall

13th century

14th century

15th century

16th century

17th century

18th century

19th century

20th century

21st century

References
   The history of the worthies of England, Volume 2 By Thomas Fuller

External links
 http://www.highsheriffnorthamptonshire.org.uk/

 
Northamptonshire
Local government in Northamptonshire
History of Northamptonshire
High Sheriff